John Frank Petit (September 29, 1887–April 9, 1963) was an American politician and businessman.

Petit was born in Sugar Grove, Illinois. He was involved with the insurance and real estate business. Petit was also involved with the Democratic Party. He served as the postmaster for Mooseheart, Illinois during the administration of President Woodrow Wilson. Petit lived in Batavia, Illinois. He served in the Illinois House of Representatives from  1928 to 1939. He died at his home in Carpentersville, Illinois from a long illness.

Notes

External links

1887 births
1963 deaths
People from Sugar Grove, Illinois
People from Batavia, Illinois
Illinois postmasters
Democratic Party members of the Illinois House of Representatives
20th-century American politicians